The 2012 SAIHA Senior Club Championship was played between September 24 and September 30, 2012 in the South African city of Kempton Park (Gauteng). The venues are the Festival Mall Ice Arena.

Participating teams

Rules
For standing purposes, points shall be awarded as follows:
 2 points for a win in regulation time
 1 points for a draw in regulation time
 No points for a loss in regulation time

The games will be played as follows:
 First 2 periods running time and the 3rd period stop time.
 The clock will stop when there is a penalty or a goal.
 The last two minutes of the 1sdt and 2nd period will be stop time.

Standings

 Penguins won gold medal.
 Penguins and Warriors were both equal on Points and Goal Difference
 Therefore, the tie breaker was determined on Goals Scored.

Fixtures & Results

All times are local (UTC+02).

Final standings
The final standings of the tournament according to SAIHA:

Officials
The SAIHA selected 5 referees to work the 2012 SAIHA Senior Club Championship. They were the following:

Referees
  Nicky Buekes
  Shane Marsh
  Frank Raude
  Barry Thandy
  Jonathan Burger

Statistics

Scoring leaders
List shows the top 10 skaters sorted by points, then goals. If the list exceeds 10 skaters because of a tie in points, all of the tied skaters are left out.
GP = Games played; G = Goals; A = Assists; Pts = Points; +/- = Plus/minus; PIM = Penalties in minutes; POS = Position

Leading goaltenders
TOI = Time on ice (minutes:seconds); SA = Shots against; GA = Goals against; GAA = Goals against average; Sv% = Save percentage; SO = Shutouts

Team rosters and stats

Penguins

 Coach: Ronni Wood
 Manager: Toni Stringer

Skaters

Goaltenders

Scorpions

 Coach: Nicky Beukes
 Manager: Peter Habib, John Watson

Skaters

Goaltenders

Vipers

 Coach: Nicholas Graff
 Manager: Sharon Fisher

Skaters

Goaltenders

Warriors

 Coach: Andre Marais
 Manager: Hannes Botha

Skaters

Goaltenders

Wildcats

 Coach: Shane Marsh
 Manager: Shane Marsh

Skaters

Goaltenders

References

External links
 African Ice Hockey website
 Pointstreak Stats & Results
 Point Streak

South African Ice Hockey Club Championship